Ciriani is a surname. Notable people with the surname include: 

Alessandro Ciriani (born 1970), Italian politician
Henri Ciriani (born 1936), Peruvian architect and teacher
Luca Ciriani (born 1967), Italian politician

Surnames of Italian origin
Italian-language surnames